Shanghai Pudong can refer to:
 Pudong, a district of Shanghai, China
 Shanghai Pudong International Airport, serving Shanghai
 Shanghai Pudong F.C., an association football club later renamed as Beijing Chengfeng
 Shanghai Zobon F.C., a defunct association football club sometimes referred to as Shanghai Pudong Zobon